Balakrishnan Nair, more popularly known as Balan K. Nair (4 April 1933  26 August 2000) was an Indian actor known for his roles in Malayalam cinema. Although he appeared as a villain in most films, he was also noted for his performances in strong character roles. He emerged as one of the top villain of Malayalam cinema in the second half of the 1970s and played some of the best villain characters in Malayalam films during that period. He won the National Film Award for Best Actor in 1981 for his performance as Govindan in the film Oppol.

Personal life

Balakrishnan (Balan K.) Nair was the eldest of four children of Idakkulam Kizhakke Veettil Kuttiraman Nair, a store owner, and Devaki Amma, a housewife in 1933 in the village of Chemancheri near Quilandy. His parents died when he was young and hence he had to take care of his siblings and discontinue his studies at eighth grade. Prior to his entry in films, he worked as a mechanic in Kozhikode and owned a metal workshop. He started his acting career at the age of 14. At that time he was associated with Sangamam Theatre in Kozhikode, Muppathunkavu troupe, Kozhikodan drama troupes and his own drama troupe Subash Theaters. After his marriage to Sharadha, he moved to Shoranur in Palakkad. His son Meghanathan is also an actor.

Balan K. Nair died of Multiple myeloma at Sree Chitra Institute of Medical Sciences Hospital, Thiruvananthapuram on 26 August 2000, aged 67.

Film career
Balan K. Nair made his debut in the film Nizhalattam, directed by A. Vincent in 1970. Prior to acting in Malayalam movies, he worked as a stunt double for Bollywood star Dev Anand. He acted in more than 300 films in Malayalam, mostly as a villain. He won the Kerala State Film Award for Second Best Actor in 1974 and 1978 for his roles in Adhiti and Thacholi Ambu. He won the National Film Award for Best Actor for his role as a reformed military officer in the 1981 film Oppol.

Some of his other well-known movies are Ee Naadu, Aaryan, and Oru Vadakkan Veeragatha. His last movie was Kadavu, in which he played the role of an oarsman directed by the novelist M. T. Vasudevan Nair based on a story by another famous literary figure S. K. Pottekkatt.

Awards

National Film Awards:

Best Actor – 1981 – Oppol

Kerala State Film Awards:

Second Best Actor – 1974 – Adhithi
Second Best Actor – 1978 – Thacholi Ambu

Filmography

Tamil
Garjanai (1981)
Sattam (1983)
Neengal Kettavai (1984)
Mangamma Sabatham (1985)

Malayalam

 Kadavu (1992) as Beeran
 Simhadhwani (1992)
 Oru Prathyeka Ariyippu (1991) as Raghavan
 Keli (1991) as Ramankutty Nair
 Amaram (1991) as Pillaichan
 Nagarangalil Chennu Raparkam (1990) as Arumukham Chettiyar
 Appu (1990) as Abu
 Purappadu (1990) as Ravunni Nair
 Gajakesariyogam (1990) as Narayanan Nambiar
 Thazhvaram (1990) as Kanaran
 Nammude Naadu (1990) as Maliyekkal Chacko
 Indrajalam (1990) as Ayyappan Nair
 Midhya (1990) as Narayanan
 Brahmarakshassu (1990) as Rudran Pillai
 Samrajyam (1990)
 Devadas (1989)
 Vaynattathinu Nalladh Karpoora Thulasi (1989) as Potty Iyer/Wakrajilli  Chettiyar/Delhi Duttan
 Adhipan (1989) as Sukumaran Mashu
 Oru Vadakkan Veeragatha (1989) as Kannappan Chekavar
 Aryan (1988) as Muhammad
 Mukthi (1988) as P. K. Nambyar
 Dhwani (1988) as Bahuleyan
 Janmasathru (1988) as Avarachan
 Ore Thooval Pakshikal (1988)
 Puravrutham (1988) as Kanaran
 Ambalakkara Panjayath (1988)
 Kanakambaragal (1988)
 Theruvu Narthaki (1988)
 Abkari (1988) as Chathunny
 Aranyakam (1988) as Ravunni
 Rahasyam Parama Rahasyam (1988)
 1921 (1988) as Beeran
 Naradhan Keralathil (1987) as Ex M. P. Menon
 Ente Sonia (1987) as Thilak
 Neeyallengil Njan (1987) as Divakaran
 Naalkavala (1987)
 Kalam Mari Katha Mari (1987) as Aliyarukunji
 Sarvakalasala (1987)
 Ithrayum Kalam (1987) as Kunjavummed Haji
 Kilipattu (1987)
 Ithente Needhi (1987)
 Adimakal Udamakal (1987) as Karunakaran Nambiar
 Bhoomiyile Rajakkanmar (1987) as Chief Minister
 Kaiyethum Doorathu (1987) as Vidwan Maraar
 Yagagni (1987) as Maran
 T. P. Balagopalan M. A. (1986) as father
 Kulambadikal (1986)
 Ashtabandham (1986) as Pisharody master
 Surabhee Yamangal (1986) as Mathews
 Bharya Oru Manthri (1986) as Balakrishnan
 Vartha (1986) as Forest Minister
 Caberet Dancer (1986)
 Meenamasathile Sooryan (1986) as Police officer
 Pidikittappulli (1986)
 Karinagam (1986)
 Ithile Iniyum Varu (1986) as M. S. Nair
 Ottayan (1985) as Balu
 Akkachide Kunjuvava (1985)
 Uyarum Njan Nadake (1985) as Nambyar
 Nullinovikkathe (1985)
 Chorakku Chora (1985) as Chellappan
 Pathamudhayam (1985) as Rahim
 Revenge (1985)
 Angadikkappurathu (1985) as Khan Sayib
 Chillukottaram (1985)
 Arodum Parayaruthu (1985)
 Vilichu Vilikettu (1985) as N. N. K. Nair
 Sannaham (1985) as Prathapan
 Shathru (1985) as U. P. Menon
 Jeevante Jeevan (1985) as Thampi
 Choodatha Pookkal (1985) as Moideen
 Vellam (1984) as Bappu
 Ulpathi (1984)
 Ivide Thudagunnu (1984) as M. S. Menon
 Rajavembala (1984)
 Uyaragalil (1984) as SP Madhavan Kurup
 Mynakam (1984)
 NH 47 (1984) as Thankappan
 Vetta (1984)
 Sree Krishna Parundu (1984) as Kunjambu
 Unaroo (1984)
 Inakili (1984) as Kunjambu
 Manithali (1984) as Judgal Abu
 Jeevitham (1984) as Ummer Haji
 Sapadham (1984) as Shekharan Pillai
 Ningalil Oru Sthree (1984) as Latha's father
 Krishna Guruvayoorappa (1984) as Melpathur Narayana Bhattathiri
 Koodu Thedunna Parava (1984) as Khader Kakka
 Piriyilla Naam (1984)
 Thacholi Thankappan (1984) as Keshu
 Bullet (1984)
 Nethavu (1984)
 Onnum Mindatha Bharya (1984) as Thampi
 Manasse Ninakku Mangalam (1984) as Doctor
 Shabadham (1984) as Sekhara Pilla
 Koottinilamkili (1984) as Yousuf
 Aalkkoottathil Thaniye (1984) as Madhavan
 Iniyenkilum (1983) as Nambiar
 Eettappuli (1983) as Shekharan
 Asthram (1983) as Stephen
 Mortuary (1983) as Narendran
 Palam (1983)
 Passport (1983) as Chandrasenan
 Hello Madras Girl (1983)
 Himam (1983) as Vaasu
 Bookambam (1983) as Shakthi
 Ankam (1983) as Father John
 Thimingalam (1983) as Kuruppu
 Kodumkattu (1983) as Raghavan
 Prathijnja (1983) as Gopalan/KRG Panikkar
 Aadhipathyam (1983) as Menon
 Ee Yugam (1983) as Nair
 Thavalam (1983)... Jayaram
 Maniyara (1983) as Ansari
 Visa (1983) as Abukka
 Asuran (1983)
 Justice Raja (1983) as Narendran, Nagendran (double role)
 Kadamba (1983) as Keshavan
 Thalam Thettiya Tharattu (1983) as Adv. Rajeshekharan
 Samrambam (1983)
 Nadi Muthal Nadi Vare (1983) as Anwar
 Varanmare Avashyamundu (1983) as Abdullakka
 Omanathinkal (1983)
 Bandham (1983)
 Nizhal Moodiya Nirangal (1983) as Thampi
 America America (1983) as Jackson
 Ee Nadu (1982) as Krishna Pillai
 Innalenkil Nale (1982) as Gopalan Mash
 Padayottam (1982) as Mootha Marakkar 
 Chambalkadu (1982)
 Mazhu (1982)
 Ankachamayam (1982) as Robert
 Kazhumaram (1982)
 Akrosham (1982) as Kollakkaaran Ganga (Gangadharan)
 Komaram (1982)
 Mylanchi (1982) as Abdhurahman Haji 
 Maattuvin Chattangale (1982)
 Veedu (1982) as Sumi's father
 Chiriyo Chiri (1982)
 Sindoora Sandhyakku Mounam (1982)... Sekhar
 John Jaffer Janardhanan (1982) as Chandran
 Aayudham (1982) as Prathapan
 Idavela (1982)
 Kattile Pattu (1982) as Panikkar
 Ahimsa (1982) as Kunjutty
 Marupacha (1982) as Mammadikka
 Thadakam (1982) as Gopakumar
 Panchajanyam (1982) as Balan
 Ethiralikal (1982) as Mathai 
 Irattimadhuram (1982) as K.B. Menon
 Beedikunjamma (1982) as Kunjamma's Father
  Sree Ayappanum Vavarum (1982) as Otheyanan
 Postmortem (1982) as Mammokka
 Koritharicha Naal (1982)
 Hamsageetham (1981)
 Ahimsa (1981) as Kunjutty
 Sphodanam (1981) as Muthalali
 Valarthu Mrigangal (1981) as Kumaran
 Garjanam (1981)
 Thusharam (1981) as Rajeshekharan Menon
 Akramanam (1981) as Majeed
 Ithihasam (1981) as Thankappan
 Thrasam (1981)
 Sangarsham (1981) as Parsha/Vikraman
 Raktham (1981) as Padmanabhan
 Oppol (1981) as Govindan
 Chaatta (1981) as Velu
 Randu Mukhangal (1981)
 Vazhikal Yathrakkar (1981)
 Adimachangala (1981)
 Poochasanyasi (1981)
 Itha Oru Dhikkari (1981) as Govinda Panikkar
 Attimari (1981) as Prasad
 Kolilakkam (1981)
 Oppol (1980) as Govindan
 Lorry (1980)
 Chandrahasam (1980) as Bhaskaran
 Angadi (1980) as Beeran
 Baktha Hanuman (1980)
 Ivar (1980) as Avaran Muthalali
 Prakadanam (1980) as Chacko
 Aswaradham (1980) as Veeraraghavan
 Benz Vasu (1980) as Varkey
 Ival Ee Vazhi Ithu Vare (1980)
 Kari Puranda Jeevithangal (1980)
 Kalika (1980) as Jamal
 Karimbana (1980) as Chellayan
 Makaravilakku (1980)
 Idimuzhakkam (1980) as Govindan Unnithan
 Lava (1980) as Velayudhan
 Moorkhan (1980) as Major Chandrasekhar
 Thenthulli (1979)
 Yakshipparu (1979) as Irumban
 Mamankam (1979)
 Arattu (1979) as Chacko
 Oru Ragam Pala Thalam (1979)
 Vijayam Nammude Senani (1979)
 Valeduthavan Valal (1979)
 Anubhavangale Nandi (1979)
 Indradhanussu (1979) as Mammad
 Thacholi Ambu (1978) as Mayin Kuttiyil
 Agni (1978) as Moosa
 Vayanadan Thampan (1978)
 Ahalya (1978)
 Black Belt (1978)
 Ashokavanam (1978)
 Chuvanna Vithukal (1978)
 Rowdy Ramu (1978) as Bhasi
 Aparadhi (1977) as Malayi Kunjumon
 Njavalpazhangal (1976)
 Panchami (1976) as Kochuvareed
 Chottanikkara Amma (1976)
 Yudhabhoomi (1976)
 Ammini Ammavan (1976) as Balan
 Samasya (1976)
 Athithi (1975) as Raghavan
 Utharayanam (1975) as Achuthan
 Udayam Kizhakku Thanne (1974)
 Thacholi Marumakan Chanthu (1974) as Yenali
 Pathiravum Pakalvelichavum (1974)
 Chenda (1973)
 Swapnam (1973)
 Soundarya Pooja (1973)
 Ragging (1973)
 Darshanam (1973)
 Mazhakkaru (1973)
 Mappusakshi (1972)
 Chembarathi (1972) as Thomas
 Panimudakku (1972) as Balan
 Kuttyedathi (1971) as Kuttayi
 Nizhalattam'' (1970) as Balan

References

External links
 
 Balan K Nair at MSI

Male actors from Kozhikode
1933 births
2000 deaths
Best Actor National Film Award winners
Kerala State Film Award winners
Male actors in Malayalam cinema
Indian male film actors
20th-century Indian male actors
Male actors in Tamil cinema
Deaths from bone cancer
Deaths from cancer in India